Speed Demon is a 1932 American Pre-Code drama film directed by D. Ross Lederman and starring William Collier Jr.

Cast
 William Collier Jr. as 'Speed' Morrow
 Joan Marsh as Jean Torrance
 Wheeler Oakman as Pete Stenner
 Robert Ellis as Langard
 George Ernest as Catfish Jones
 Frank Sheridan as Captain Torrance
 Wade Boteler as Runyan
 Edward LeSaint as Judge (as Edward J. LeSaint)
 Fuzzy Knight as Lefty
 Ethan Laidlaw as Red
 Harry Tenbrook as Bull

References

External links
 

1932 films
1932 drama films
Boat racing films
American drama films
1930s English-language films
American black-and-white films
Films directed by D. Ross Lederman
Columbia Pictures films
1930s American films